Altin Kryeziu (born 3 January 2002) is a professional footballer who plays as a midfielder for Slovenian PrvaLiga club Maribor. Born in Slovenia, he represented both Slovenia and Kosovo at international level.

Club career

Early career and SPAL
Kryeziu was born and raised in Kranj, Slovenia, where he started playing football at Triglav Kranj. In 2019, he was transferred to Serie A club SPAL. On 27 October 2019, he was named as a first team substitute for the first time in a league match against Napoli.

Torino
On 25 September 2020, Kryeziu joined Serie A side Torino. Two days later, he made his debut for the youth team in a 1–0 home defeat against Sassuolo after coming on as a substitute. On 22 November 2020, he was an unused substitute in Torino's Serie A game against Internazionale.

Loan at Virton
In August 2021, Kryeziu was sent on a season-long loan to Belgian First Division B side Virton. Two days after joining, he made his debut in a 2–0 away defeat against Lierse Kempenzonen after being named in the starting line-up.

Loan at Tabor Sežana
On 10 February 2022, Kryeziu joined Slovenian PrvaLiga side Tabor Sežana on loan for the remainder of the 2021–22 season.

Maribor
On 12 October 2022, Kryeziu signed for reigning Slovenian champions Maribor until the end of the 2023–24 season.

International career

Slovenia
On 23 August 2018, Kryeziu received a call-up from Slovenia U17 for the friendly matches against Switzerland U17. Five days later, he made his debut with Slovenia U17 in the first friendly match against Switzerland U17 after coming on as a 57th minute substitute in place of Jan Majcen.

Kosovo
On 29 August 2020, Kryeziu received a call-up from Kosovo U21 for the 2021 UEFA European Under-21 Championship qualification match against England U21, and made his debut after being named in the starting line-up.

References

External links

Altin Kryeziu at the Football Association of Slovenia 

2002 births
Living people
Sportspeople from Kranj
Association football midfielders
Kosovan footballers
Kosovo youth international footballers
Kosovo under-21 international footballers
Kosovan expatriate footballers
Kosovan expatriate sportspeople in Italy
Kosovan expatriate sportspeople in Belgium
Slovenian footballers
Slovenia youth international footballers
Slovenian expatriate footballers
Slovenian expatriate sportspeople in Italy
Slovenian expatriate sportspeople in Belgium
Slovenian people of Kosovan descent
Slovenian people of Albanian descent
S.P.A.L. players
Torino F.C. players
R.E. Virton players
NK Tabor Sežana players
NK Maribor players
Challenger Pro League players
Slovenian PrvaLiga players
Expatriate footballers in Italy
Expatriate footballers in Belgium